Chris Nicholson may refer to:

Chris Nicholson (athlete) (born 1967), New Zealand Olympian, competing in cycling and speed skating
Chris Nicholson (magician), close up magician
Chris Nicholson (sailor) (born 1969), Australian Olympic yachtsman

See also
Christopher Robert Nicholson (born 1945), South African cricketer and jurist